Monetaria caputserpentis, common name the serpent's-head cowry or snakehead cowry, is a species of cowry, a sea snail, a marine gastropod mollusk in the family Cypraeidae, the cowries.

Distribution
 This species occurs in the Red Sea, Indian Ocean, tropical Indo-West Pacific, Australia and the Philippines. This sea snail lives on corals, rock reefs and rocky shores from the intertidal zone down to depths of 200 m.

Description
The basic color of the shell is reddish-brown, with many whitish dots on the top of the dorsum, which sometimes shows a clear longitudinal line. The underside is light beige.

Frequently these shells are sold with a purple top, which is achieved by dipping the dorsum in acid.

Synonyms
In literature and on various websites the synonym Cypraea caputserpentis is still commonly used.

There are two  subspecies :
 Monetaria caputserpentis caputserpentis Linnaeus (synonym : Cypraea caputserpentis caputserpentis Linnaeus, 1758)
 Monetaria caputserpentis caputophidii (Schilder, 1927)

References

Further reading 
 Cantera J. R. (1991). "First record of the Indo-Pacific gastropod Cypraea caputserpentis (Linnaeus, 1758) at Isla Gorgona, Colombia". Veliger 34: 85–87.
 Meyer C. 2003. Molecular systematics of cowries (Gastropoda: Cypraeidae) and diversification patterns in the tropics. Biological Journal of the Linnean Society, 79: 401–459. page(s): 411

External links 

 On-line articles with Cypraea caputserpentis in the HAWAIIAN SHELL NEWS (1960-1994)
OBIS Indo-Pacific Molluscan database

 

Cypraeidae
Gastropods described in 1758
Taxa named by Carl Linnaeus
Articles containing video clips